Edwin Fabián Mátiz Ruiz is a Colombian paralympic cyclist. He participated at the 2016 Summer Paralympics in the cycling competition, being awarded the bronze medal in the men's individual pursuit C5 event. Fabián Mátiz Ruiz previously participated at the 2015 Parapan American Games.

References

External links 
Paralympic Games profile

Living people
Place of birth missing (living people)
Year of birth missing (living people)
Colombian male cyclists
Colombian track cyclists
Cyclists at the 2016 Summer Paralympics
Medalists at the 2016 Summer Paralympics
Paralympic medalists in cycling
Paralympic cyclists of Colombia
Paralympic bronze medalists for Colombia
21st-century Colombian people